Jarl Johnsen (September 17, 1913 – December 13, 1986) was a Norwegian boxer who competed in the 1936 Summer Olympics.

He was born in Stavanger.

In 1936 he eliminated in the first round of the light heavyweight class after losing his fight to Robey Leibbrandt.

External links
 

1913 births
1986 deaths
Sportspeople from Stavanger
Light-heavyweight boxers
Olympic boxers of Norway
Boxers at the 1936 Summer Olympics
Norwegian male boxers
20th-century Norwegian people